54th Division or 54th Infantry Division may refer to:

 54th Division (People's Republic of China)
 54th Infantry Division (German Empire)
 54th Reserve Division (German Empire)
 54th Infantry Division (India), a modern Indian division
 54th Infantry Division Napoli, an Italian division of World War II
 54th Division (Imperial Japanese Army)
 54th Division (Spain)
 54th (East Anglian) Infantry Division, a British division of World Wars I and II
 54th Guards Rifle Division, a Soviet division of World War II
 54th Guards Rocket Division, a modern Russian division